Kalem is a settlement in the central part of Scott County, Mississippi, United States, near Morton. Kalem was formed in 1911 from an old settlement called Concord. Kalem was a flag and water tank stop on the Yazoo and Mississippi Valley Railroad.  Kalem was noted for its corn, cotton, peanuts, sugarcane, potatoes, and other vegetables. Today its economy relies on chicken houses and cow pastures, and the Kansas City Southern Railroad Co. runs through the community today.

Churches

Kalem United Methodist Church
Still Blessed Worship Center

Populated places in Scott County, Mississippi